
 is a Japanese novelist who has published works in German, English and Japanese.

Born the daughter of a prominent Shinto priest, Matsubara grew up at Kenkun Shrine in the northern part of Kyoto. She graduated from high school in Kyoto, then attended Tokyo's International Christian University, where she studied comparative religion and literature. After receiving a BA, she moved to the United States to study theater arts at Pennsylvania State University, from which she graduated with a MA. She worked for a while as an editor in the US before moving to Germany in 1962. She lived in  Marburg and Göttingen, where she attended the university and perfected her German language skills. She then settled in Cologne, and in 1970, obtained her PhD in philosophy jointly from the  Ruhr University of Bochum and the University of Göttingen. In 1967 Matsubara started to write a regular column at the German weekly newspaper Die Zeit. This work turned into a collection of short stories and essays, Blick aus Mandelaugen, 1968, through which she entered the German literary scene.
In 1969, Matsubara published a German translation of the ancient Japanese tale Taketori-monogatari. She worked on documentaries of the major German TV stations ARD and ZDF. She published several novels in German (Brokatrausch 1978, Samurai 1979, Glückspforte 1980, Abendkranich 1981, Brückenbogen 1986,Karpfentanz 1994, Himmelszeichen 1998,) which were quite successful in Germany and internationally as well. Her novels are set during recent Japanese history addressing changes in Japanese culture relating to modernization and western influences.
Matsubara also wrote non-fiction books (Weg zu Japan 1983, and Raumschiff Japan 1989) highlighting contrasts between Japanese history and European history over the past five centuries. She moved back to the US in the mid 1980s, where she was a scholar at the Hoover Institution of Stanford University. In recent years, she has published mostly in Japanese, both fiction and non-fiction.  Currently she lives with her family in Los Altos.

Hisako Matsubara is a member of the German PEN since 1971 and since 1985 a member of the American Art Directors Club. She received the New York Critics Award in 1985 and in 1987 she was the Writer in residence at the East West Center in Manoa, Hawaii.

Matsubara is married to the German solid state physicist Friedemann Freund. Their son, the physicist Minoru Freund (1962-2012), died of brain tumor (glioblastoma) in early 2012. The woodcut artist Naoko Matsubara is her younger sister.

Works
 The Tale of the Shining Princess, Kodansha International Ltd. 1966, 
  "Die Geschichte des Bambussammler, Langewiesche-Brand, 1966
 Blick aus Mandelaugen: Eine Japanerin in Deutschland, Piper 1968, 
  "Hisako Matsubara's Weltausstellung", Piper 1969, 
 Brokatrausch, Albrecht Knaus 1978, 
 Samurai, Times Books 1980, 
 Glückspforte,  Albrecht Knaus 1980, 
 Abendkranich: Eine Kindheit in Japan, Albrecht Knaus 1981 
  "Blick aus Mandelaugen: West-Ostliche Miniature" Albrecht Knaus 1981 
 Cranes at Dusk (Abendkranich), Doubleday 1985, 
 Brückenbogen, Albrecht Knaus 1986, 
 Wakon no jidai, Mikasa Shobo 1987, 
 Nihon no chie Yoroppa no chie, Mikasa Shobo 1987, 
 Raumschiff Japan: Realität und Provokation, Albrecht Knaus 1989, 
 The Japanese: A Mystery Unfolded, Atlantic Monthly Press 1990, 
 Karpfentanz, Albrecht Knaus 1994, 
 Himmelszeichen, Albrecht Knaus 2000, 
  "Kotoageseyo Nihon", President Sha 2000, 
  "Ogoreru Hakujin", Bungei Shunju 2005, 
  "Kuroi Jujika", Fujiwara Shoten 2008, 
 Mino: A young scientist's life-long journey through outer and inner space, Daniel & Daniel 2019

References
 Review of Cranes at Dusk and a biographical note on the author (archived version)
 Sharon Dirlam: Cranes at Dusk. Los Angeles Times, 1985-2-17
 Review of the German translation of Taketori-monogatari in Die Zeit (December 12, 1969, German)
 Hisako Matsubara at Munzinger Online (German)

Further reading
 Sharon G. Carson: Violence in Female bildung: Hisako Matsubara and Ella Leffland. Literature Interpretation Theory, Volume 3, Issue 2, 1991, pp. 151-161
 Ulrike Reeg: Autor/innen aus dem asiatischen Kulturraum. In: Carmine Chiellino (Hrsg.): Interkulturelle Literatur in Deutschland: Ein Handbuch. Springer, 2000, pp. 263–274, in particular pp. 265-67 (German)
 Friedemann Freund and Stephanie Langhoff, editors: "Universe of Scales: From Nanotechnology to Cosmology" Symposium in Honor of Minoru M. Freund; Springer Proceedings in Physics 150, 2014

Notes 

Japanese writers
1935 births
Living people